Law and History Review is a quarterly peer-reviewed academic journal covering legal history. It was established in 1983 and is published by Cambridge University Press on behalf of the American Society for Legal History, of which it is the official journal. The editor-in-chief is Gautham Rao (American University). According to the Journal Citation Reports, the journal has a 2016 impact factor of 0.7.

References

External links

Quarterly journals
Publications established in 1983
Cambridge University Press academic journals
Academic journals associated with international learned and professional societies
English-language journals
Legal history journals